AlphaGo is a 2017 documentary directed by Greg Kohs about the Google DeepMind Challenge Match with top-ranked Go player Lee Sedol.

Premise 
The film presents how AlphaGo, a computer program developed by DeepMind Technologies, mastered the game of Go through artificial intelligence. Its competence was tested by Lee Sedol, a South Korean world champion.

Release 
AlphaGo was released in New York City on September 29, 2017, and Los Angeles next month.

Reception

Critical response 
AlphaGo earned positive reviews. On Rotten Tomatoes, the film has an approval rating of 100%, with an average score of 8/10, based on 10 reviews. Charlotte O'Sullivan of Evening Standard gave the film 4 stars out of five, calling it a "gripping, emotional documentary, which gets us thinking, about thinking, in a whole new way."

Accolades

Winner 
 Denver International Film Festival (2017) - Maysles Brothers Award, Best documentary
 New Media Film Festival (2018) - Best Trailer
 Traverse City Film Festival (2017) - Knowledge is Power Science Prize
 Warsaw International Film Festival (2017) - Audience Award, documentary feature

Nominee 
 Anchorage International Film Festival (2017) - Best Documentary Feature
 Critics' Choice Documentary Awards (2017) - Best Sports Documentary
 Philadelphia Film Festival (2017) - Student Choice Award

References

External links 
 
 
 
 

2017 films
2017 documentary films
AlphaGo
American documentary films
Documentary films about Google
Go films
2010s American films